Jerome Friedman may refer to:

 Jerome Isaac Friedman (born 1930), American physicist
 Jerome B. Friedman (born 1943), United States federal judge
 Jerome H. Friedman (born 1939), American statistician